The Third Kejriwal cabinet is the Council of Ministers in Delhi Legislative Assembly headed by Chief Minister Arvind Kejriwal.

It was formed after the results of the 2020 Delhi Legislative Assembly election were declared.

History
In August 2022 a floor majority test was conducted in the Delhi Assembly by the Delhi Chief Minister, to prove that the AAP government enjoyed the majority and BJP's Operation Lotus had failed to poach AAP MLAs.

Council of Ministers

By ministry

By year 
 2020 : On 16 February, CM Arvind Kejriwal announced the  first appointment of ministers to the departments of Delhi state government.

 2022 : On 8 October, Rajendra Pal Gautam announced his resignation from the #Council of Ministers of Delhi state government. AAP has not responded formally to the resignation.

Former Members

Budget
On 26 March 2022, a budget of ₹75,800 crore rupees was presented in the Delhi Assembly by the Finance minister Manish Sisodia. AAP leaders expected that the budget would create employment for 20 lakh people in Delhi, in the upcoming five years.

Major work

Mohalla Clinic 
Aam Aadmi Mohalla Clinics (AAMC) were opened in every neighborhood for providing free medical care. The scheme has received international acclaim.

Jai Bheem Mukhyamantri Pratiba Vikas Yojana 
As minister Rajendra Pal Gautam held the charge of social welfare department in the Kejriwal ministry. Under his charge Jai Bheem Mukhyamantri Pratiba Vikas Yojana was started. Indian Express noted it as one of Arvind Kejriwal government's most ambitious programmes. In this program, free coaching is provided to children from the Scheduled Castes and Scheduled Tribes to prepare them for IIT JEE, NEET and other competitive exams. When the program started about 4,900 students enrolled for the free coaching classes. in 2022, around 15,000 are enrolled in various courses under this scheme.

See also
 Seventh Legislative Assembly of Delhi

References

External links
Council of Ministers

Delhi Legislative Assembly
Cabinets established in 2020
2020 establishments in Delhi
Politics of Delhi
Delhi cabinets
Kejriwal government
Lists of current Indian state and territorial ministries
2020 in Indian politics